Gedu Andargachew is an Ethiopian politician who currently is the National Security Affairs Advisor to the prime minister of Ethiopia since 4 November 2020. He served as president of the Amhara Region from 2013 to 2019 and served as deputy president of the region and head of the agriculture bureau. He also served as the Minister of Foreign Affairs from April 2019 to November 2020.
 
Gedu was first selected in 2013 to replace Ayalew Gobeze, and was successively reelected by the regional legislature in 2015 and 2018. He resigned on 8 March 2019 for he reasons that were unclear, though in his farewell address he warned of rising inter-ethnic tensions with the Tigray Region. He was replaced by Ambachew Mekonnen.

References

Living people
Presidents of Amhara Region
21st-century Ethiopian politicians
Foreign ministers of Ethiopia
People from Amhara Region
Year of birth missing (living people)
Government ministers of Ethiopia